Wallace and Gromit: A Close Shave is a 1995 British stop-motion animated short film co-written and directed by Nick Park and produced by Aardman Animations with Wallace and Gromit Ltd., BBC Bristol and BBC Children's International. It is the third film featuring Wallace and Gromit, following A Grand Day Out (1989) and The Wrong Trousers (1993). In A Close Shave, Wallace and Gromit uncover a plot to rustle sheep by a sinister dog.

Like The Wrong Trousers, A Close Shave won the Academy Award for Best Animated Short Film. A Close Shave saw the first appearance of Shaun, who became the protagonist of the Shaun the Sheep spin-off  series.

Plot 

The inventor Wallace and his dog Gromit operate a window cleaning business. Wallace falls for the wool shopkeeper Wendolene Ramsbottom. Her sinister dog, Preston, rustles sheep to supply the shop. After a lost sheep wanders into the house, Wallace places him in his Knit-o-Matic, which shears sheep and knits the wool into jumpers. Wallace names the sheep Shaun. 

Preston steals the Knit-o-Matic blueprints. When Gromit investigates, Preston captures him and frames him for the sheep rustling. Gromit is arrested and imprisoned, while Wallace's house is inundated with sheep. Wallace and the sheep rescue Gromit and hide out in the fields. Wendolene and Preston arrive in the lorry to round up the sheep. When Wendolene demands Preston stop the rustling, he locks her in the lorry with the sheep and drives away, intent on turning them into dog food.

Wallace and Gromit give chase on their motorcycle. When Gromit's sidecar detaches, he activates its aeroplane mode and resumes the chase from the air. Wallace becomes trapped in the lorry and he, Wendolene and the sheep are transported to Preston's factory, where Preston has built an enormous Knit-o-Matic. The captives are loaded into the wash basin, but Shaun escapes. Shaun activates neon signs to reveal the factory's location to Gromit, who attacks Preston. Shaun sucks Preston into the Knit-o-Matic, removing his fur. Wendolene reveals that Preston is actually a robot created by her inventor father for good, but became evil.

When the Knit-o-Matic dresses Preston in a sweater made of his fur, he inadvertently hits the controls, and the group become poised to fall into the mincing machine. Shaun pushes Preston into the machine, crushing him. Gromit is exonerated and Wallace rebuilds Preston as a harmless remote controlled dog. Afterwards, Wallace is saddened when Wendolene leaves and tells him that she is allergic to cheese. When he tries to cheer himself up with some cheese, he finds that Shaun has eaten it all.

Cast
 Peter Sallis as Wallace
 Anne Reid as Wendolene Ramsbottom

Reception

On Rotten Tomatoes, A Close Shave has a perfect score of 100% based on 19 reviews, with an average rating of 8.6/10.

References

External links

 
 

1990s animated short films
1990s children's fantasy films
1995 fantasy films
1990s stop-motion animated films
1995 animated films
1995 comedy films
1995 films
1995 short films
1995 television films
Aardman Animations short films
Animated comedy films
Animated films about animals
Animated films about robots
Best Animated Short Academy Award winners
BBC Television shows
British animated short films
Clay animation films
Films about dogs
Films about sheep
Films directed by Nick Park
Films with screenplays by Bob Baker (scriptwriter)
Films with screenplays by Nick Park
Stop-motion animated short films
Wallace and Gromit films
1990s British films